Marathon Sports is an Ecuadorian sports equipment manufacturing company founded by Rodrigo Ribadeneira in May 1981, when the brand opened its first store. The company, headquartered in Quito, manufactures and distributes athletic sportswear to sports teams and athletes, mainly association football uniforms.

In addition to its own products, Marathon imports, distributes, and markets some of the most important global brands of clothing and accessories, such as Adidas, Nike, Puma, Diadora, Wilson, and Joma. There are currently 88 stores in Ecuador.

History 
The company was founded in May 1981 by Rodrigo Rivadeneira. It began as a sporting store chain in Ecuador until 1994, when the Reebok contract with Ecuador national football team was set to expire. Marathon Sports then signed a contract with the Ecuadorian Football Federation for an unknown number of years. This was later renewed in 2016 for a total of US$ 2,6 million, expiring in 2023. The first national squad jersey design had a band of thick blue and red stripes on the right shoulder reflecting the flag of Ecuador. After a great, although unsuccessful qualifying campaign for the FIFA World Cup in 1998, the Ecuadorian Federation decided to stick with the brand.

In 2002 the Ecuadorian team qualified for its first World Cup, held in Korea and Japan –the first FIFA's jointly hosted World Cup. Marathon Sports consolidated as an international brand, having sponsored not only football teams in Ecuador but in Peru (Deportivo Municipal and Uruguay (Rampla Juniors). Moreover, Marathon Sports opened stores in Lima (Peru).

In 2017, the company signed a contract with the PFP to become official shirt supplier of Peru national team since 2018 for a total of USD 1,5 million –plus 8 million in sporting goods. The offer largely overcome Adidas', which had also showed interest in the Peruvian team.

Sponsorships 
Current teams wearing uniforms manufactured by Marathon are:

National teams 
  Bolivia
 Ecuador

Club teams 
 The Strongest
 Arriba Perú
 Barcelona S.C.
 Independiente del Valle
 Universitario
 Always Ready

References

External links 

 

Companies of Ecuador
Ecuadorian brands
Sportswear brands
Clothing companies established in 1981